The 2008 Rolex Sports Car Series season was the ninth season of the Grand-Am Rolex Sports Car Series presented by Crown Royal Cask No. 16. The 14-race championship for Daytona Prototypes (DP) and 13-race championship for Grand Touring (GT) cars began January 26, 2008 and concluded on September 20, 2008.  New Jersey Motorsports Park replaced Iowa Speedway. At 15 races, it was the longest Rolex Sports Car Series season.

Chip Ganassi Racing drivers Scott Pruett and Memo Rojas won the DP drivers' championship, with Riley and Pontiac won the chassis and engine manufacturers' championships, respectively.  In the GT class, Kelly Collins and Paul Edwards won the drivers' championship and brought Pontiac the manufacturers' championship.

Schedule
All 200 or  events have a maximum time limit of 2 hours and 45 minutes. 2008 season marked New Jersey Motorsports Park's Rolex Sports Car Series debut.

Television 
 All races will be shown in the United States and Canada on Speed Channel with the exception of the first 90 minutes of the Rolex 24 at Daytona, which will be shown on Fox.
 The Rolex 24 at Daytona will be broadcast in high-definition for the first time ever.
 The series will also be broadcast to Europe, Latin America, and South America by SportKlub and Speed Latin America.
 The ESPN Family of Networks will broadcast one-hour highlight shows to other countries not receiving full broadcasts.

Changes

Rules
For 2008 all participants will use Pirelli P-Zero racing tires until the end of 2010 season before Pirelli return to Formula One in 2011.
A driver must now drive at least 30 minutes in a race to receive championship points.
Safety car pit lane procedure has changed:
DP cars pit on first lap after pit lane opens
GT cars pit on second lap after pit lane opens

Competition Adjustments
May 27, 2008:
Pontiac GTO and GXP.R maximum rear weight percentage reduced from 51% to 49%
June 17, 2008:

Season Results

Driver standings

DP

GT

†: Did not complete 30 minutes of driving, and was not awarded points
Tiebreakers: Driver with the highest number of superior finishes is ranked higher

Manufacturer Standings

DP Engine

DP Chassis

GT

Entrants

References

Rolex Sports Car Series
Rolex Sports Car Series